Populus balsamifera, commonly called balsam poplar, bam, bamtree, eastern balsam-poplar, hackmatack, tacamahac poplar, tacamahaca, is a tree species in the balsam poplar species group in the poplar genus, Populus. The genus name Populus is from the Latin for poplar, and the specific epithet balsamifera from Latin for "balsam-bearing".

Populus balsamifera is the northernmost North American hardwood, growing transcontinentally on boreal and montane upland and flood plain sites, and attaining its best development on flood plains. It is a hardy, fast-growing tree which is generally short lived, but some trees as old as 200 years have been found.

The tree is known for its strong, sweet fragrance, which emanates from its sticky, resinous buds. The smell has been compared to that of the balsam fir tree.

Taxonomy
The black cottonwood, Populus trichocarpa, is sometimes considered a subspecies of P. balsamifera and may lend its common name to this species, although the black poplars and cottonwoods of Populus sect. Aigeiros are not closely related.

The balm-of-Gilead (Populus × jackii), also known as P. × gileadensis, is the hybrid between P. balsamifera and the eastern cottonwood (P. deltoides), occurring occasionally where the two parental species' ranges overlap. This hybrid is also sometimes planted as a shade tree, and sometimes escapes from cultivation. The name Populus candicans has been variously used for either P. balsamifera or P. × jackii; it is currently considered a synonym of P. balsamifera.

Uses
The light, soft wood of Populus balsamifera is used for pulp and construction. The resinous sap (or the tree's balsam) comes from its buds, and is sometimes used as a hive disinfectant by bees.

Branches containing the resinous buds are sometimes blown to the ground by spring windstorms, and herbalists from many cultures seek these out to make medicine from them. These sticky spring buds are a highly prized ingredient in medicinal salves and other herbal preparations in both Indigenous North American and European herbal traditions.

Many kinds of animals use the twigs of Populus balsamifera for food. The leaves of the tree serve as food for caterpillars of various Lepidoptera. See List of Lepidoptera that feed on poplars.

References 

Butterfly food plants
Flora of the Northern United States
Plants described in 1753
Taxa named by Carl Linnaeus
balsamifera
Trees of Alaska
Trees of Alberta
Trees of British Columbia
Trees of Canada
Trees of Ontario
Trees of the Great Lakes region (North America)
Trees of the North-Central United States
Trees of the Northeastern United States
Trees of the Northwestern United States
Trees of the Southeastern United States
Flora without expected TNC conservation status